San Pietro alla Magione is an ancient church on Via Camollia in Siena, Italy.

Documents attest to a church at the site since 998. It is built in stone, and preceded by a stairs and a Romanesque bell portal. The austere interior was restored in 1957 and contains a Gothic tabernacle from the second half of the 14th century, a Madonna with Saints John the Baptist and Peter by Diego Pesco, fragments of frescoes (Cruxifixion and Biblical Stories) by Cristoforo di Bindoccio and Meo di Pero. The chapel on the right was erected in 1523-26 as an ex voto for the passing of the plague; it houses a Martyrdom of St Donnino by Antonio Nasini, a fragment of a Madonna with Child attributed to Lorenzo Rustici.

Sources
Rete Toscana Luoghi della Fede, entry on church.

Pietro alla Magione
10th-century churches in Italy